Kasei is a village in the Ejura/Sekyedumase district, a district in the Ashanti Region of Ghana. In November 2015, former Ghanaian President John Dramani Mahama stated a school with 24 classrooms and other facilities would be built in Kasei. There is a modern hospital located in Kasei called St. Luke's Hospital.

References

Populated places in the Ashanti Region